Both divisions of the Japan Soccer League were given the 3-1-0 league format.

League tables

First Division
Yomiuri won its fourth JSL title and went to the Asian Club Championship. Nissan, by virtue of its Emperor's Cup win, represented Japan for the first time in the Asian Cup Winners' Cup.

Yanmar Diesel, four-time champions in the 1970s, was relegated for the first time after an aimless decade. Nippon Kokan, who two seasons before was contending for the title, was relegated as well and would cease to exist by the middle of the decade.

Second Division
Struggling fallen giants Hitachi and Mazda were promoted back to the top flight after a few seasons of second division wilderness: Hitachi at the first attempt, Mazda on the third.

Yawata Steel, co-founder of the First Division with them in 1965, was relegated, leaving only five JSL founding clubs that would professionalize for the J.League. Osaka Gas, who never looked like national league material, joined them.

Japan Soccer League seasons
1990 in Japanese football leagues
1991 in Japanese football leagues
Japan Soccer League